Maggie Geha (born April 4, 1988) is an American actress and model. She is known for playing the adult Ivy "Pamela" Pepper in 12 episodes of the Fox TV series Gotham and as Susan in six episodes of All My Children.

Life and career
Maggie Geha was born and raised in Boston, Massachusetts, in 1988. She attended high school in Vermont and then college in Newport, Rhode Island. Geha has lived in New York City and has studied theater with a focus on performance at Marymount Manhattan College.
In June 2016, it was announced that she would assume the role of the adult Poison Ivy in the U.S. television series Gotham. After just one year, she left the series and was replaced by Peyton List. Beside her work as an actress, she is working as a model and was Miss Vermont Teen USA in 2004. She is also known for her roles in Ted 2 and Winter's Tale.  In August 2018, it was announced that Geha would have the regular role of Abigail "Abby" Spencer on the Netflix situation comedy series Mr. Iglesias.

Filmography

References

External links
 

1988 births
American film actresses
American television actresses
Actresses from Massachusetts
American female models
Female models from Massachusetts
Living people
21st-century American actresses